Michael Lee "M.L." Harris (born January 16, 1954 in Columbus, Ohio) is a former professional American football player who played tight end and on special teams for six seasons for the Cincinnati Bengals. He also played four seasons in the Canadian Football League. He is currently a pastor and an author.

Harris college football for Kansas State University and was undrafted. He played two seasons in the CFL with the Hamilton Tiger-Cats in 1976-77 followed by two seasons with the Toronto Argonauts in 1978-79 before signing with the NFL's Cincinnati Bengals.

During his six NFL seasons, he totaled 99 receptions for 1,369 yards for a 13.8 yards-per reception average and 10 touchdowns. His most productive season by far was in 1984 when, starting all 16 games, he caught 48 passes for 759 yards (15.8 yards per catch) and two touchdowns.

Harris played in Super Bowl XVI for the Bengals, where they lost 26-21 to the San Francisco 49ers.

Harris currently operates the M.L. Harris All Boys Academy that teaches life skills, academics, leadership and character as well as sports, in conjunction with the New Life Outreach Christian Center in Reynoldsburg, Ohio. He is the father of former Bowling Green State University standout, Josh Harris.

References

1954 births
American football tight ends
Canadian football slotbacks
Cincinnati Bengals players
Toronto Argonauts players
Hamilton Tiger-Cats players
Kansas State Wildcats football players
Tampa Spartans football players
Living people